Wellspring Academy Trust is a multi-academy trust that manages 28 schools in the north of England. As an academy trust, it is an exempt charity regulated by the Department for Education.

Schools

 Beacon Academy, Cleethorpes
 Bramley Park Academy
 Eastfield Infants and Nursery Academy
 Ebor Gardens Primary Academy
 Elements Primary Free School
 Forest Moor School
 Green Meadows Academy
 Greenacre School
 Horncastle Primary
 Joseph Norton Academy
 Lacey Gardens Junior Academy
 Littlecoates Primary Academy
 Oakhill Primary Academy
 Oakwell Rise Primary Academy
 Penny Field School
 Phoenix Park Academy
 Sevenhills Academy
 Springwell Alternative Academy
 Springwell Alternative Academy Grantham
 Springwell Alternative Academy Lincoln
 Springwell Alternative Academy Mablethorpe
 Springwell Alternative Academy Spalding
 Springwell Leeds Academy
 Springwell Lincoln City Academy
 Springwell Special Academy
 The Forest Academy, Barnsley
 The Forest School
 Victoria Primary Academy

References

External links
 

Educational charities based in the United Kingdom
Educational institutions established in 2012
Academy trusts
2012 establishments in England